Haiyan North Road Station is an interchange station on Line 1 and Line 5 of the Ningbo Rail Transit that started operations on 30 May 2014. It is situated under Ningchuan Road in Yinzhou District of Ningbo City, Zhejiang Province, eastern China.

Exits

References

Railway stations in Zhejiang
Railway stations in China opened in 2014
Ningbo Rail Transit stations